Thomas, Tom, or Tommy Atkins may refer to:

People
 Thomas Atkins (mercer), (fl. 1570s to 1590s) Elizabethan, who was the Member of Parliament and holder of public offices
 Thomas Atkins (Lord Mayor) (fl. 1640 to 1653), Lord Mayor of London, 1637
 Tommy Atkins (director) (1887–1968), American film director
 Tommy Atkins (baseball) (1887–1956), pitcher in Major League Baseball
 Thomas E. Atkins (1921–1999), United States Army soldier and Medal of Honor recipient
 Tom Atkins (actor) (born 1935), American television and film actor
 Thomas I. Atkins (1939–2008), Boston City Council member and General Counsel of the NAACP
 Tom Atkins (footballer) (born 1995), Australian rules footballer

Other uses
 Tommy Atkins, a term for a common soldier in the British Army
 Tommy Atkins (1915 film), a British film
 Tommy Atkins (1928 film), a British film
 Tommy Atkins (mango), a mango cultivar

See also
 Tom Adkins (born 1958), American political pundit
 Tommy Adkins (born 1932), Canadian football player
 "Tommy" (Kipling poem) (1890)

Atkins, Thomas